The International School of Kigali-Rwanda (ISKR) is an independent, co-educational, English-medium K–12 school in Kigali, the capital of Rwanda. The school was founded in 2009. The school moved to its current location in Nyarutarama in March 2014. It encompasses an Early Childhood Center, an Elementary school and a Secondary school. In September 2021, the school has moved to a new campus in Kigabagaba, the new campus offers a vast space for the children.

References

External links

 International School of Kigali Rwanda
 Location on Google Maps

Schools in Kigali
International schools in Rwanda
International high schools
Educational institutions established in 2009
2009 establishments in Rwanda